
Gmina Krasne is a rural gmina (administrative district) in Przasnysz County, Masovian Voivodeship, in east-central Poland.

Villages
Gmina Krasne contains the villages and settlements of Augustów, Barańce, Bartołdy, Brzozowo Małe, Brzozowo Wielkie, Dąbki, Dębowa Karczma, Filipy, Godacze, Gorąca, Grabówko, Grabowo Gęsie, Grabowo Wielkie, Gustawin, Helenów, Iłówko, Jaźwiny, Kamienice-Ślesice, Kozin, Kraski-Ślesice, Krasne, Krasne-Elżbiecin, Kurówko, Kurowo, Łyszkowo, Milewo-Brzegędy, Milewo-Bylice, Milewo-Gawary, Milewo-Kulki, Milewo-Rączki, Milewo-Ruszczyny, Milewo-Szwejki, Milewo-Tabuły, Mosaki-Rukle, Mosaki-Stara Wieś, Niesiobędy, Nowa Wieś, Nowe Żmijewo, Nowokrasne, Pęczki-Kozłowo, Stary Janin, Szlasy-Leszcze, Szlasy-Umiemy, Szlasy-Żalne, Wężewo, Zalesie, Żbiki, Żbiki-Antosy, Żbiki-Gawronki, Żbiki-Kierzki, Żbiki-Starki, Zielona and Zielonki.

Neighbouring gminas
Gmina Krasne is bordered by the gminas of Czernice Borowe, Gołymin-Ośrodek, Karniewo, Opinogóra Górna, Płoniawy-Bramura and Przasnysz.

References

Polish official population figures 2006

Krasne
Gmina Krasne